Fetu'u Moana Vainikolo (born 30 January 1985) is a Tongan rugby union player who currently plays for the Utah Warriors in Major League Rugby (MLR). His regular playing position is Wing.

Early life
Born in Tonga, Vainikolo's family moved to New Zealand in 1997 when he was 12. He moved through rugby age group levels in Auckland before moving to the Wellsford club in Northland in 2007.

Club career

New Zealand
Vainikolo made his  debut in the 2007 Air New Zealand Cup, scoring five tries in just 10 matches to earn himself a Super Rugby contract. He repeated the feat with another five tries in 2008. Vainikolo transferred to Otago to join many of his Highlanders teammates for the 2009 Air New Zealand Cup. However, he was unable to duplicate his success for Northland, missing much of 2009 through injury and then struggling with poor form throughout the 2010 ITM Cup.

On the heels of his success with Northland, Vainikolo was drafted into the Highlanders squad for the 2008 Super 14 season. While the team endured a difficult campaign, Vainikolo stood out as an offensive weapon, finishing third in the entire competition with six tries, including several of the highlight-reel variety. In the 2009 Super 14 season, Vainikolo struggled to repeat his first-year success, scoring only two tries and coming into increased criticism for his defensive play, splitting starts with the more reliable Kendrick Lynn. In 2010, he started the season sharing playing time with James Paterson, but started the last seven games of the year and finished with five tries to co-lead the club along with Israel Dagg. Concerns about his all-around game and poor form during the 2010 ITM Cup saw Vainikolo left off the Highlanders main squad for the 2011 Super 15 season, although he was included in the team's wider training group.

Europe
On the conclusion of Tonga's participation at the 2011 Rugby World Cup, Vainikolo joined the Irish province Connacht for the 2011–2012 season. Having missed the pre-season and the first two months of the RaboDirectPro12 season, Vainikolo struggled to establish himself in the starting XV. Gradually, as he has settled and his performances improved as his confidence grew, he established himself as a key component in the Connacht attack. He is most notable for his eagerness to get involved, frequently coming infield to make a key tackle or to help clear out a ruck.
After 14 Connacht appearances in 2011–12 between Pro12 & Heineken Cup and 3 league tries, season 2012–13 held much promise for the fan favorite Tongan. He scored a vital try against Irish Rivals Leinster Rugby, in a Pro12 derby to help Connacht gain a 34–6 win over the European champions. Vainikolo ran 50 metres to score a crucial try as Connacht beat French giants Biarritz in the Heineken Cup. He started in all six of Connacht's Heineken Cup games, and featured in seventeen of Connacht's twenty two Pro12 games.

Exeter Chiefs announced on their official website on 9 May 2013 that Vainikolo would be joining the Chiefs on a two-year deal. Vainikolo scored a try on his competitive debut for the Chiefs during a 44-29 victory over Cardiff Blues in the Heineken Cup.

After his stint with the Chiefs, Vanikolo signed with Top 14 side Oyonnax.

International career
Vainikolo was selected in the Tonga 2011 World Cup squad on 8 August, and made his test debut on 13 August 2011 against Fiji in a 27–12 loss. His second appearance came one week later with a starting place in Tonga's 32–20 win against Fiji at Churchill Park, Lautoka in which he scored his first try for Tonga.

At RWC 2011, his first World Cup outing was a starting place in Tonga's 25–20 loss to Canada, his second appearance came against Japan in which he scored Tonga's third try in a 31–18 group match. win.

Fetu'u was called into the Tongan 2012 IRB Pacific Nations Cup squad, which was being hosted by Japan and Fiji in June 2012. He scored two tries in the first match of the 2013 IRB Pacific Nations Cup, in which Tonga beat Japan 27–17 on 25 May 2013.

Vainikolo is currently the top try scorer for the Tongan national team.

References

External links
Profile at scrum.com

1985 births
Living people
Connacht Rugby players
Exeter Chiefs players
Expatriate rugby union players in England
Expatriate rugby union players in Ireland
Expatriate rugby union players in the United States
Highlanders (rugby union) players
New Zealand expatriate rugby union players
New Zealand expatriate sportspeople in England
New Zealand expatriate sportspeople in Ireland
New Zealand expatriate sportspeople in the United States
Northland rugby union players
Otago rugby union players
People educated at Marcellin College, Auckland
People from Tongatapu
Rugby union wings
Tonga international rugby union players
Tongan emigrants to New Zealand
Tongan expatriate rugby union players
Tongan expatriate sportspeople in Ireland
Tongan expatriate sportspeople in England
Tongan expatriate sportspeople in the United States
Utah Warriors players